Cardwell Creek is a stream in the U.S. state of Oregon. It is a tributary to Sams Creek.

Cardwell Creek was named in 1865 after one John A.Cardwell.

References

Rivers of Oregon
Rivers of Jackson County, Oregon